Elsie Motz Lowdon (1883 - 1960) was an American painter of portrait miniatures.

Life 
Born in Waco, Texas, Lowden spent her youth there, studying with Eleanor T. Wragg at Baylor University, before moving to New York City, where she undertook further lessons with Lucia Fairchild Fuller and Elsie Dodge Pattee. Her works were exhibited in that city, in Atlanta, and in Washington, D.C. as well as in her native state, where she was included in the Texas Centennial Exposition of 1936; she also showed her work at a variety of other venues, presenting a portrait at the Panama–Pacific International Exposition in 1915. Known particularly for portraiture, she depicted members of such prominent Houston families as the Blaffers and Hobbys, as well as noted novelist Ellen Glasgow. Lowdon also produced a variety of interior and genre scenes. She died in Fort Worth, and is buried in Abilene, in the Abilene Municipal Cemetery.

Lowdon was a member of the National Association of Women Painters and Sculptors, the Southern States Art League, and the Texas Fine Arts Association. Four of her miniatures are in the collection of the Smithsonian American Art Museum, and two are owned by the Metropolitan Museum of Art. Her work may also be found in The Grace Museum in Abilene.

References

1883 births
1960 deaths
American women painters
20th-century American painters
20th-century American women artists
American portrait painters
Portrait miniaturists
People from Waco, Texas
Painters from Texas
Baylor University alumni